The 2008–09 Essex Senior Football League season was the 38th in the history of Essex Senior Football League a football competition in England.

League table

The league featured 15 clubs which competed in the league last season, along with one new club:
Takeley, promoted from the Essex Olympian League

League table

References

Essex Senior Football League seasons
9